Michael Mehlem (born 1 May 1977) is an Austrian former footballer who played as a midfielder.

External links
 

1977 births
Living people
Austrian footballers
LASK players
SW Bregenz players
SV Ried players
SK Vorwärts Steyr players
Association football midfielders